Digital Signal Designation is the classification of digital bit rates in the digital multiplex hierarchy used in transport of signals from one location to another in telecommunications.

The DS technically refers to the rate and format of the signal, while the T designation refers to the equipment providing the signals. In practice, "DS" and "T" are used synonymously; for example, DS1 and T1, DS3 and T3.

Digital signal line rates

North America

Europe

Optical carrier
See SONET for more information.

References

Multiplexing